

The Union Club of Boston, founded in 1863, is one of the oldest gentlemen's clubs in the United States.  It is located on Beacon Hill, adjacent to the Massachusetts State House.  The clubhouse at No. 7 and No. 8 Park Street was originally the homes of John Amory Lowell (#7), and Abbott Lawrence (#8). The houses were built c.1830-40, and they were remodeled for club use in 1896.  The clubhouse overlooks the Boston Common, and has views of the Common itself, Boston's Back Bay neighborhood, and the hills to the west of the city.

The Union Club was formed by members of another prominent Boston gentlemen's club, the Somerset Club, after disagreement over whether to support the Union cause during the American Civil War, about which the members of the club split along political lines. In response, defectors formed the Union Club, which demanded "unqualified loyalty to the constitution and the Union of our United States, and unwavering support of the Federal Government in effort for the suppression of the rebellion." The founders of the club did not restrict membership to those of a single political party, but accepted all those willing to support the Union Cause in the Civil War. 

The club later became the first male club in the city to welcome women as members.

Notable Members
President of the United States
Calvin Coolidge, Republican (1923-1929)
Vice-president of the United States
Henry Wilson, Republican (1873-1875), under Ulysses S. Grant
Speaker of the U.S. House of Representatives
Frederick Huntington Gillett, Republican (1919-1925) 
United States Senators
Charles Sumner, Free Soil, Liberal Republican, Republican (1851-1874)
Edward Everett, Whig (1853-1854)
Henry Wilson, Republican (1855-1873)
George Frisbie Hoar, Republican (1877-1904)
Henry Cabot Lodge, Republican (1893-1924)
Winthrop Murray Crane, Republican (1904-1913)
Frederick Huntington Gillett, Republican (1925-1931)
Sinclair Weeks, Republican (1944)
United States Supreme Court Justices
Horace Gray (1881-1902)
Louis Dembitz Brandeis (1916-1939)
Governors of Massachusetts
Edward Everett, Whig (1836-1846)
Emory Washburn, Whig (1854-1855)
John Albion Andrew, Republican (1861-1866)
Alexander Hamilton Bullock, Republican (1866-1869)
William Claflin, Republican (1869-1872)
William Gaston, Democrat (1875-1876)
Alexander Hamilton Rice, Republican (1876-1879)
John Davis Long, Republican (1880-1883)
Benjamin Franklin Butler, Democrat (1883-1884)
William Eustis Russell, Democrat (1891-1894)
Roger Wolcott, Republican (1896-1900)
Winthrop Murray Crane, Republican (1900-1903)
Curtis Guild, Jr., Republican (1906-1909)
Eben Sumner Draper, Republican (1909-1911)
Samuel Walker McCall, Republican (1916-1919)
Calvin Coolidge, Republican (1919-1921)
Channing Harris Cox, Republican (1921-1925)
Frank G. Allen, Republican (1929-1931)
Joseph Buell Ely, Democrat (1931-1935)
Presidents of Harvard University 
Josiah Quincy (1829-1846)
Edward Everett (1846-1849)
Jared Sparks (1849-1853)
Presidents of the Massachusetts Institute of Technology
Willian Barton Rogers (1862-1870)
Francis Amasa Walker (1881-1897)
Karl Taylor Compton (1930-1948)
James Rhyne Killian, Jr. (1948-1959)
Men of letters, authors, poets, scholars, politicians, etc.
Charles Francis Adams, Jr. – author and historian
John K. Burgess, state representative 
Henry Ingersoll Bowditch, - abolitionist
Richard Henry Dana, Jr., - author
Charles Deven, Jr. - general
Ralph Waldo Emerson – philosopher
John Murray Forbes – merchant, philanthropist and abolitionist
Asa Gray – botanist
Edward Everett Hale – theologian
Henry Lee Higginson – founder of the Boston Symphony Orchestra
Thomas Wentworth Higginson – soldier and writer
Oliver Wendell Holmes, Sr. – poet, novelist and physician
James Russel Lowell – poet
Charles Eliot Norton – editor and man of letters
Francis Parkman – historian
Josiah Quincy, IV – Mayor of Boston
Charles Storer Storrow, civil engineer and industrialist
William Fiske Whitney – anatomist, curator and pathologist

See also
 List of American gentlemen's clubs

References

External links

Official website

1863 establishments in Massachusetts
Beacon Hill, Boston
Clubs and societies in Boston
Gentlemen's clubs in the United States